"Sovereign Light Café" is a song by English alternative rock band Keane released as the third single from their fourth studio album, Strangeland.

The band played the song for first time during the Perfect Symmetry World Tour on 17 September 2009 in Thunder Bay Ontario.

The band announced on their official website: "With Strangeland sitting atop the UK album chart for a second week, we're pleased to report that the next single to be taken from the album will be Sovereign Light Café, which is released on 16th July".

The song is written with inspiration drawn from the town of Bexhill-on-Sea in East Sussex, where the café is located in real life, and also the town of Battle, where many of the roads mentioned are close to where the members of Keane grew up.

Music video

The music video was premiered on 30 May 2012. It was filmed in Bexhill-on-Sea and directed by Lindy Heymann. The video shows band members strolling the town as they are surrounded by various dancers, acrobats, bicyclists and Heathfield Silver Band. The band members and all the performers meet outside the Sovereign Light Café Coffee Shop at the end of the video and it ends with a group photo.

Track listing
Digital download
"Sovereign Light Café" – 3:38
"Difficult Child" – 3:44

Digital download — remix
"Sovereign Light Café" (Afrojack Remix) – 6:16

Charts

Weekly charts

Year-end charts

References

Keane (band) songs
2012 singles
Songs written by Tim Rice-Oxley
Songs written by Tom Chaplin
Songs written by Richard Hughes (musician)
Songs written by Jesse Quin
2012 songs
Music videos directed by Lindy Heymann
Island Records singles